Sturgeon Creek may refer to:

 Sturgeon Creek (Georgia), a tributary of the Ocmulgee River
 Sturgeon Creek (Washington)
 Sturgeon Creek, a former provincial electoral division in the Canadian province of Manitoba.